Poecilasthena euphylla is a moth of the family Geometridae first described by Edward Meyrick in 1891. It is found in Australia, including Tasmania.

References

External links
Australian Faunal Directory

Moths of Australia
Moths described in 1891
Poecilasthena